Shmuel lavan (born January 21, 1982) is an Israeli former footballer who played as a defender.

References

1982 births
Israeli Jews
Belgian Jews
Living people
Israeli footballers
Belgian footballers
Beitar Jerusalem F.C. players
Royal Antwerp F.C. players
K.M.S.K. Deinze players
Israeli Premier League players
Footballers from Jerusalem
Association football defenders
Belgian emigrants to Israel
Israel under-21 international footballers